The Russian National Orchestra was founded in Moscow in 1990 by pianist and conductor Mikhail Pletnev. It was the first Russian orchestra to perform at the Apostolic Palace, Vatican and in Israel.

History 
The RNO's first recording (1991) was Tchaikovsky's Symphony No. 6, Pathétique, released on Virgin Classics. Since then, the orchestra has made over 80 recordings for Deutsche Grammophon, Pentatone, Ondine, Warner Classics and other labels, and with conductors that include RNO Founder and Artistic Director Mikhail Pletnev, Vladimir Jurowski, Paavo Järvi, Kent Nagano, Carlo Ponti, José Serebrier and Vasily Petrenko. Notable releases include the complete Beethoven symphonies and piano concertos on Deutsche Grammophon, Tchaikovsky's six symphonies for Pentatone, and the RNO Shostakovich project, also on Pentatone.

The RNO's recording of Prokofiev's Peter and the Wolf and Beintus's Wolf Tracks, conducted by Kent Nagano and narrated by Sophia Loren, Bill Clinton and Mikhail Gorbachev, was the winner of a 2004 Grammy Award, making the RNO the first Russian orchestra ever to win this honor.  A Spanish-language version narrated by Antonio Banderas was released in 2007, following a Russian version narrated by actors Oleg Tabakov and Sergei Bezrukov, with a Mandarin edition following in 2011. Narrators in concert versions of these works have included actors Danny Glover, Diana Douglas, Sean Dill and Debbie Allen, model Tatiana Sorokko, Singaporean violinist Min Lee, and BBC anchor Seva Novgorodsev.

Touring annually, the RNO appears in the music capitals of Europe, Asia and the Americas, and is a frequent guest at festivals such as Edinburgh, the BBC Proms, Festival Napa Valley, and Festival of the Arts BOCA.  In 2009 the RNO launched its own annual festival, the RNO Grand Festival, held each September to open the Moscow season. The tenth anniversary festival was held from September 10 to October 4, 2018.

RNO concerts are often aired on National Public Radio, the European Broadcasting Union, and Russia's Kultura channel.

In 2008, a panel of international critics assembled by Gramophone named the Russian National Orchestra as one of the world's top orchestras.

The RNO maintains two outreach programs in the US and Russia: Cultural Allies, encompassing exchanges between artists in Russia and the West and the commissioning of new works; and the Magic of Music, bringing RNO musicians to play for children in Moscow's orphanages, special facilities for the mentally and physically disabled, and bringing school children to concert halls in Moscow for RNO children's concerts. In the two decades since the Magic of Music program was created, it has expanded to the US with Russian National Orchestra musicians performing for school children while on tour. 

The Russian National Orchestra is a private institution supported by individuals, corporations and foundations in Russia and throughout the world. Organizations that support the RNO include the Russian Arts Foundation, Prince Michael of Kent Foundation, Ann and Gordon Getty Foundation, Mikhail Prokhorov Foundation, and the Trust for Mutual Understanding.

Awards

Recordings
Since 1990, the RNO has released over 80 recordings on CD and SACD. These include:

External links 

Official Website (English)

References

Musical groups established in 1990
National orchestras
Russian symphony orchestras
1990 establishments in Russia